Sol de Tentacion is a Venezuelan telenovela written by Vivel Nouel and produced by Venevisión in 1996.  This telenovela lasted 168 episodes and was distributed internationally by Venevisión International.

On July 17, 1996, Venevisión started broadcasting Sol de tentación weekdays at 9:00pm, replacing Quirpa de tres mujeres. The last episode was broadcast on January 21, 1997, with Todo por tu amor replacing it the following day.

Natalia Streignard and Miguel de León starred as the main protagonists with Adolfo Cubas, Ana Karina Manco and Maria Fabiola Colmenares as the main antagonists.

Synopsis
Sol is a poor young girl who lives with her father, Hipolito Romero, on an old ship anchored close to the shore of a small coastal town. Fishing and sailing are her passions, and the sea is her home. When she was a small child, her mother abandoned her to run away with a wealthy tourist. Sol and her father, however, believe that her brother drowned in the ocean that they love so much. Armando de la Torre is handsome, rich and lives in the capital city. He is on vacation on his family’s yacht with a group of friends and his arrogant fiancee: Martita Aristigueta. A boating accident initially brings Armando and Sol together, lighting the spark of love. Later, at a street festival in town, they meet again and, consumed by an irresistible attraction, they begin a passionate love affair. Martita, crazy with jealousy, sets out to do everything in her power to destroy Sol and Armando's happiness. Resorting to lies and intrigue, she manages to make Armando distrust Sol and put an end to their relationship. A disillusioned Armando marries Martita; Sol, feeling abandoned and desperate, decides to marry Rildo, a former suitor, in spite of the fact that she is expecting Armando's baby. Fifteen years later, destiny places Sol in the path of her former lover, Armando. Now, they are both filled with anguish upon learning that their respective children have fallen in love with each other. Only the strongest, truest love will be able to reunite Sol and Armando, allowing them to make up for lost time. Meanwhile, their children, Atlanta and Alejandro, are more in love every day... and will fight all impediments in the way of their final happiness.

Cast

Natalia Streignard as Sol Romero
Miguel de León as Jose Armando Santalucia
Aroldo Betancourt as Rildo Castillo. Villain, later good.
Ana Karina Manco as Sandra Rionegro. Villain, killed by Marta.
Julio Pereira as Daniel Romero & Moises Irrazabal
Maria Fabiola Colmenares as Marta Irrazabal Main female villain. Killed by Emilio.
Jorge Palacios as Rogelio Santalucia
Adolfo Cubas as Emilio Berdugo Main male villain. Responsible for death of Arturo, Esther and Marta. Killed by Marta.
Mauricio González as Hipolito Romero
Jennifer Rodriguez as Alina
Vangie Labalan as Fabiola Castilla
Jonathan Montenegro as Luis Alejandro Romero
Albi de Abreu as Ezequiel
Virginia Garcia as Estrella Maria
Fedra Lopez as Katiuska
Marita Capote as Monica de Romero
Rosita Vásquez as Casta
Laura Cerra as María Monitos
Cristina Obin as Lourdes Santalucia
José Torres as Casimiro
Rita de Gois as Esther de Irrazabal
Rodolfo Drago as Arturo Irrazabal. Villain. Killed by Emilio.
Eliseo Perera as Toribio
Julio Capote as Padre Felicio
Yanis Chimaras as Gonzalo Santalucia
Patricia Oliveros as Irene Santalucia
Francisco Ferrari as Francisco
Deyanira Hernández as Alysson
Jhonny Zapata as Reinaldo
Antonio Machuca as Mercurio
Adelaida Mora as Gabriela Dominguez
Jenny Valdez as Mirna
Wilmer Machado as Guallallo
Asdrubal Blanco as Antonio Garcia-Quinto
Jose Vieira as Dr. Enrique Ramos Urdaneta
Niurka Acevedo as Rubi
Nancy Gonzalez as Salome de Rionegro. Villain.
Ana Massimo as Carla
Ivette Dominguez as Jade

References

External links
 Sol de Tentacion at the Internet Movie Database
 Opening Credits

1996 telenovelas
Venevisión telenovelas
Venezuelan telenovelas
1996 Venezuelan television series debuts
1996 Venezuelan television series endings
Spanish-language telenovelas
Television shows set in Venezuela